Enrico Ruggeri (born 5 June 1957) is an Italian singer-songwriter.

Biography
A native of Milan, Ruggeri made his debut in the 1970s with the punk band Decibel. In 1981 he began his solo career and established himself as a songwriter: his most famous success in this latter role is "Il mare d'inverno" ("The Sea in Winter"), brought to chart by Loredana Bertè.

He won the Sanremo Music Festival twice: in 1987 with "Si può dare di più" ("You can give more") together with Gianni Morandi and Umberto Tozzi and in 1993 with "Mistero" ("Mystery"). He represented Italy at Eurovision Song Contest 1993 with the song "Sole D'Europa" ("Sun of Europe").

In 2016 Ruggeri re-joined the newly reformed Decibel and went on to participate in the 2018 edition of the Sanremo Music Festival. A special performance of their song "Lettera dal Duca" during one of the festival nights featured Midge Ure on vocals and guitar.

Ruggeri is a well-known supporter of Inter Milan.

Discography

Solo albums
 1981: Champagne molotov
 1983: Polvere
 1984: Presente
 1985: Tutto scorre
 1986: Difesa francese
 1986: Enrico VIII 
 1987: Vai Rouge (live)
 1988: La parola ai testimoni
 1989: Contatti
 1990: Il falco e il gabbiano
 1991: Peter Pan
 1993: La giostra della memoria
 1994: Oggetti smarriti
 1996: Fango e stelle 
 1997: Domani è un altro giorno
 1998: La gente con alma (in Spanish)
 1999: L' isola dei tesori
 2000: L' uomo che vola
 2001: La vie en rouge (live)
 2002: La vie en rouge (re-packaging with two new songs)
 2003: Gli occhi del musicista
 2004: Punk prima di te
 2005: Amore e guerra
 2006: Cuore muscoli e cervello 
 2007: Il regalo di Natale
 2008: Rock show
 2009: L'ultima follia di Enrico Ruggeri 
 2009: Il regalo di Natale (re-packaging of "L'ultima follia di Enrico Ruggeri" with three new songs)
 2010: La ruota
 2012: Le Canzoni Ai Testimoni
 2013: Frankenstein
 2014: Frankenstein 2.0
 2015: Pezzi di vita
 2016: Un viaggio incredibile

With Decibel
 1977: Punk
 1980: Vivo da re
 2017: Noblesse Oblige
 2018: L'anticristo
 2019: Punksnotdead (live)

References

External links

 

 
 

1957 births
Living people
Singers from Milan
Italian singer-songwriters
Italian musicians
Sanremo Music Festival winners
Eurovision Song Contest entrants for Italy
Eurovision Song Contest entrants of 1993